Love Is Dead is the third studio album by Scottish synth-pop band Chvrches. It was released on 25 May 2018 by Virgin EMI Records and Goodbye Records. The album was co-produced by Greg Kurstin, marking the first time the band have worked with outside producers. The band collaborated with David Stewart from Eurythmics and Matt Berninger from The National during production. The album was announced by Martin Doherty at the start of January 2018, with frontwoman Lauren Mayberry accidentally revealing the album's name in a since-deleted interview that same month.

After wiping their social media accounts, the band released the lead single, "Get Out", on 31 January. The track listing for the album was released two days before the next single, "My Enemy", which featured Berninger, was released on 28 February. The third single from the album, "Never Say Die", was released on 29 March. "Miracle" was released as the fourth single on 10 April.

Videos were released for "Get Out", "Miracle", "Out Of My Head" and "Graffiti".

The song "Forever" is featured prominently in the third season of the Netflix series Elite.

Background
In September 2015, the band released their second studio album, Every Open Eye, two years after the release of their critically acclaimed debut album, The Bones of What You Believe. It received positive reviews and spawned the singles "Leave a Trace", "Clearest Blue", "Never Ending Circles" and "Empty Threat". Besides releasing the song "Warning Call", cowritten with Solar Fields, for the game Mirror's Edge Catalyst, and releasing a version of "Bury It" with Paramore's Hayley Williams, the band stayed relatively quiet for the rest of the year and the next.

On 1 January 2018, Martin Doherty announced that the band would release an album within the year. That same month, Lauren Mayberry "accidentally" confirmed this and revealed the album's title in an interview, which has been since deleted. On 26 February, the band revealed the tracklist to the album on Twitter.

Recording and production
The band started working on Love Is Dead on 7 February 2017 in Los Angeles. In 24 February, David Stewart, formerly one-half of the musical duo Eurythmics, revealed that he was in the studio with the band. Greg Kurstin was revealed as a producer for the album on 12 December, with work nearing completion. According to an article from The Independent, the band opted for more universal topics instead of introspection during production, jotting down ideas in a notebook whenever an opportunity passed.

Musical style
In an interview with Entertainment Weekly, the band described their work with Kurstin as "the most pop stuff we've done and also the most aggressive and vulnerable at the same time". On Annie Mac's BBC Radio 1 show, on the premiere of "Get Out", Mayberry said that: 
She also explained the album would take an "honest" approach.

Promotion
The album's lead single, "Get Out", premiered on BBC Radio 1 on 31 January 2018, where Annie Mac dubbed it the Hottest Record in the World; it was released the same day. The second single, "My Enemy", featuring vocals from Matt Berninger of The National, was named Zane Lowe's World Record when it premiered on Beats 1 in 28 February, after the tracklist and artwork reveal. "Never Say Die" was released on 29 March, the third single from the album. Premiered on BBC Radio 1, "Miracle" was released on 10 April as the fourth and final single. It is the album's only song recorded in the United Kingdom.

Prior to the release of "Get Out", and after wiping all of their social media accounts, the band released a short video with a weblink captioned "GET IN", which contained a link that would lead to a Facebook Messenger page made by the band. Furthermore, in the music video for the respective single, alongside Matt Berninger taping an advertisement, a poster advertised a phone number. When called, Mayberry reads part of the lyrics to "My Enemy".

Prior to the official release, the band celebrated the upcoming album with a release party by performing live at iHeartRadio Album Release Party in New York City on 22 May. During the show, they debuted some of the new music for the first time, including songs like "God's Plan", "Graffiti" and "Forever".

Commercial performance
Love Is Dead debuted at number seven on the UK Albums Chart, selling 11,763 copies in its first week. The album debuted at number 11 on the US Billboard 200 as well as number 1 on the Top Alternative Albums and Top Rock Albums chart with 28,000 album equivalent units.

Track listing

Personnel
Credits adapted from the liner notes of Love Is Dead.

Chvrches
 Iain Cook
 Martin Doherty
 Lauren Mayberry

Additional musicians
 Ian Chang – drums

Technical

 Greg Kurstin – record engineering 
 Julian Burg – record engineering 
 Alex Pasco – record engineering 
 David Simpson – record engineering 
 Sean O'Brien – record engineering 
 Dann Pursey – record engineering 
 Chris Laws – record engineering 
 Mark Bengston – record engineering 
 Chvrches – record engineering 
 Hideyuki Matsuhashi – record engineering 
 Spike Stent – mixing
 Michael Freeman – mixing assistance
 Chris Gehringer – mastering

Artwork
 Warren Fu – creative direction
 Liz Hirsch – design, layout
 Lindsey Byrnes – sleeve photograph
 Danny Clinch – inside photograph

Charts

Certifications

Love Is Dead Tour
In support of their new album, Chvrches played live worldwide in the festival circuit and venues between 2018 and 2019. The tour officially started on 25 May 2018, with a free show at House Of Vans in London to celebrate the release of their album, but an early album release party held at iHeartRadio Theatre in New York and other two previous shows (19 May 2018 - The Josie Dye One Year Anniversary Show at Danforth Music Hall in Toronto and 21 May 2018 - Elsewhere, Brooklyn, NY) are generally considered as part of the tour based on their common setlist and stage design. On 10 December 2019, the band  announced the official end of the tour with a message posted on their blog. The band performed in over 20 countries, attending more than 150 events. For the very first time since their formation, the band added a live drummer, Jonny Scott, to their touring lineup.

Setlist 

While the played setlist varied slightly with each show, the typical setlist contained:

 "Get Out"
 "Bury It"
 "Gun"
 "We Sink"
 "Graffiti"
 "Graves"
 "Miracle"
 "Under the Tide"
 "Science/Visions"
 "Forever"
 "Recover"
 "Leave a Trace"
 "Clearest Blue"
 "Never Say Die"
 "The Mother We Share"

Stage Design and Crew 
For the Love is Dead tour, the stage design was created by the lighting designer and programmer Louis Oliver, who has been working with the band since 2013. The idea behind the blueprints was to use a flexible design which could fit any type of show size. "The main request from the band was to have a more performance focused design, with looks that amplified their performance." while avoiding the use of any large video screens. The solution was to create 15 touring lighting pods containing 16 Elation Fuze Par Z120 which allowed them to adapt to each venue's limitations. The lighting setup also included 12 Robe BMFL Wash Beams, 13 GLP JDC1, 2 Base Hazer Pros and 2 grandMA2 Light consoles. The most visible elements of the floor package were three custom-built pieces comprising two crosses and a balancing symbol that mimic the artwork created by Warren Fu for the Love is Dead album cover.

The tour crew also included:

 Tour Manager: Cara McDaniel
 Production Manager: Patrick Scott
 Lighting Director: Greg Hill
 Lighting Crew Chief: Christopher Hassfurther
 Lighting Tech: Troy Grubb
 Sound Engineer: David Simpson
 Lighting Crew Chief: Amanda "Cupcake" Ritchie
 Lighting Tech: Josh Welch

Shows 
The performances with short setlists (five songs or fewer) are not included in the list below.

Tour dates

Notes

References

2018 albums
Chvrches albums
Glassnote Records albums
Virgin EMI Records albums
Albums produced by Greg Kurstin
Albums produced by Steve Mac